Adelaide Airport , also known as Adelaide International Airport, is the principal airport of Adelaide, South Australia and the fifth-busiest airport in Australia, servicing 8.5 million passengers in the financial year ending 30 June 2019. It has been operated privately by Adelaide Airport Limited under a long-term lease from the Commonwealth Government since 29 May 1998.

First established in 1955, a new dual international/domestic terminal was opened in 2005 which has received numerous awards, including being named the world's second-best international airport (5–15 million passengers) in 2006. Also, it has been named Australia's best capital city airport in 2006, 2009 and 2011.

Over the financial year 2018–2019, Adelaide Airport experienced passenger growth of 7% internationally and 1.3% for domestic and regional passengers from 2017's quarterly report; this added up to a new record number of passengers who passed through Adelaide Airport at 8,090,000 over the financial year. Adelaide Airport also experienced the greatest international growth out of any Australian port.

History
The small facility allowed for a mail service between Adelaide and Sydney. To meet the substantial growth in aviation, Parafield Airport was developed in 1927. The demand on aviation outgrew Parafield and the current site of Adelaide Airport was selected at West Torrens (known as West Beach until 1991) in January 1946. An alternative site at Port Adelaide, including a seaplane facility, was considered inferior and too far from the central business district. Construction began and flights commenced in 1954, with Parafield Airport being turned into a private and military aviation facility.

An annexe to one of the large hangars at the airport served as a passenger terminal until the Commonwealth Government provided funds for the construction of a temporary building.

In May 1998, Adelaide Airport Limited purchased the long-term leases of Adelaide Airport and Parafield Airport from the Commonwealth of Australia. As at April 2015, the shareholders of Adelaide Airport Limited comprised UniSuper (49%), Statewide (19.5%), Colonial (15.3%), IFM Investors (12.8%), Perron Group (3.4%).

In 2005 a dual-use $260 million facility replaced both the original 'temporary' domestic and international terminals. The old domestic terminal was closed shortly after the new terminal was opened to flights and was demolished not long after. A new control tower was built west of the current terminal with the old control tower maintained for additional operations.

In October 2006, the new terminal was named the Capital City Airport of the Year at the Australian Aviation Industry Awards in Cairns. In March 2007, Adelaide Airport was rated the world's second-best airport in the 5–15 million passengers category at the Airports Council International (ACI) 2006 awards in Dubai.

Plans were announced for an expansion of the terminal in July 2007, including more aerobridges and demolition of the old International Terminal.

On 5 August 2008 Tiger Airways Australia confirmed that Adelaide Airport would become the airline's second hub which would base two of the airline's Airbus A320s by early 2009. On 29 October 2009 Tiger announced it would be housing its third A320 at Adelaide Airport from early 2010. Tiger Airways later shut down its operations from Adelaide only to recommence them in 2013.

In 2011 the airport encountered major problems during the eruption of Puyehue volcano in Chile. The ash cloud caused flights to be cancelled nationwide, with over 40,000 passengers stranded in Adelaide.

On 11 October 2022, it was discovered that at around 10am local time, security screening equipment had failed half an hour earlier, leading to the evacuation of the terminal and re-screening of approximately 2,000 passengers.

International

International services became regular from 1982 upon the construction of an international terminal.

The original international terminal had only one gate with limited space for passengers. Check-in desks were small and waiting space was limited. It was partially demolished to make the area more secure and allow aircraft to park on the other side of the terminal.

On 18 December 2018, Singapore Airlines upgraded their Singapore to Adelaide flight from the Airbus A330-300 to the new Airbus A350-900 fitted with their dual-class regional configuration.

Fiji Airways also upgraded their new Boeing 737-8 MAX aircraft on the Nadi to Adelaide route, but due to the grounding of the 737 MAX aircraft, switched to the Boeing 737-800. However, Fiji Airlines announced that they would no longer fly to Adelaide as of 20 July 2019.

In late 2018 and early 2019, China Southern, Cathay Pacific and Malaysia Airlines increased their services to Adelaide Airport to accommodate the increase in demand.

The airport is also a heavy cargo destination for Volga-Dnepr Airlines, who require 2.5 km of runway for the Antonov cargo plane.

In July 2020, Emirates announced their suspension of services to Adelaide Airport due to low demand caused by the COVID-19 pandemic. Their Adelaide based staff have also been laid off. Emirates noted they wish to return their services to Adelaide Airport once travel demand has increased.

Present terminal building
The airport was redeveloped at a cost of $260 million and opened 8 October 2005. The redevelopment was managed by builders Hansen Yuncken. Before the redevelopment, the old airport terminal was criticised for its limited capacity and lack of aerobridges.

Proposals were developed for an upgraded terminal of world standard. The final proposal, released in 1997, called for a large, unified terminal in which both domestic and international flights would use the same terminal. A combination of factors, the most notable of which was the collapse of Ansett Australia, then a duopoly domestic carrier with Qantas, and the resultant loss of funds for its share of the construction cost, saw the new terminal plans shelved until an agreement was reached in 2002. 

The new terminal was opened on 7 October 2005 by the Prime Minister John Howard and South Australian Premier Mike Rann. However, Adelaide Airport Limited announced soon afterwards that only international flights would use the new facility immediately due to problems with the fuel pumps and underground pipes. These problems related initially to the anti-rusting agent applied to the insides of the fuel pumps, then to construction debris in the pipes. Although international and regional (from December 2005) aircraft were refuelled via tankers, a lack of space and safety concerns prevented this action for domestic jet aircraft, which instead continued operations at the old terminal. The re-fueling system was cleared of all debris and the new terminal was used for all flights from 17 February 2006. The new airport terminal is approximately  end to end and is capable of handling 27 aircraft, including an Airbus A380, simultaneously and processing 3,000 passengers per hour. It includes high-amenity public and airline lounges, 14 glass-sided aerobridges, 42 common user check-in desks and 34 shop fronts. Free wireless Internet is also provided throughout the terminal by Internode Systems, a first for an Australian airport.

Vickers Vimy museum
In 1919, the Australian government offered £10,000 for the first All-Australian crew to fly an aeroplane from England to Australia. Keith Macpherson Smith, Ross Macpherson Smith and mechanics Jim Bennett and Wally Shiers completed the journey from Hounslow Heath Aerodrome to Darwin via Singapore and Batavia on 10 December 1919. Due to relocation of the terminal buildings, the museum is now situated inside the long-term car park. In 2019, the state and federal government committed $2 million each towards a new preservation facility inside the airport's $165 million terminal expansion.

Recent development

In February 2011, a A$100 million building program was launched as part of a five-year master plan, including a new road network within the airport, a multi-storey car park, increasing short-term parking spaces from 800 to 1,650 (completed August 2012); a new plaza frontage for the passenger terminal (completed March 2013); a walkway bridge connecting new car park and existing terminal building (completed March 2013); terminal concourse extension; three new aerobridges; terminal commercial projects and passenger facilities; relocation of regional carrier Rex.

In July 2013, Adelaide Airport became the first Australian airport and second airport worldwide to have Google Street View technology, allowing passengers to explore the arrival and departure sections of the airport before travel.

In January 2015, the Adelaide Airport Master Plan 2014 was approved by the Commonwealth Minister for Infrastructure and Regional Development.

In September 2016, a relocation and major upgrade was completed for the base of the central service region of the Royal Flying Doctor Service of Australia. The base houses many Pilatus PC-12 and one Pilatus PC-24, maintenance hangars and ambulance bays.

The Atura Hotel ( tall, nine levels) was completed in September 2018.

In late 2018 and early 2019, Adelaide Airport commenced a $165 million terminal expansion project, increasing the length of the terminal, adding more duty-free and shopping outlets, and increasing international capacity. The upgrades are set to be completed by 2021. The old international terminal was also demolished in 2019, after lying empty for many years.

In early 2020, Adelaide Airport opened a newly updated concourse which was finished in December 2019, New Shops include Penfolds Wine Bar & Kitchen, Precinct Adelaide Kitchen, Soul Origin, Boost Juice, Lego Kaboom and Airport Pharmacy.

Lucerne to cool runways
A world-first project that lowers runway temperatures by growing commercial crops irrigated by recycled water was trialled at Adelaide Airport, with the first trial completed in 2019. By planting  of various crops and testing the effects of each on runway temperature, the scientists found that tree lucerne was most successful, leading to a reduction of an average 3 °C in average ambient air temperatures on warm days, in and around the irrigation areas. Not only was the lucerne the best performer compared with tall fescue, couch grass and kikuyu, but it can also be cut into hay and sold as stock feed. The Airport is creating a business case to extend the project to cover  of airport land.

Airlines and destinations

Passenger

Cargo

Traffic and statistics

Notes
Fiji Airways began services to Adelaide on 30 June 2017

Annual passengers

Cargo

Ground transport
Adelaide Metro operates frequent JetBus buses connecting the airport to a number of popular locations across metropolitan Adelaide.

Route J1X (currently cancelled due to COVID-19) operates an express service to and from the airport to the Adelaide CBD. Routes J1 and J2 operate between the northern, western and southern suburbs, via the CBD and airport – popular areas such as Tea Tree Plaza, Glenelg and Harbour Town are serviced. Routes J7 and J8 operate to West Lakes and Marion.

Taxis and rental cars are also available near the terminal building.

There were plans to build a rail line to the airport, but as of May 2020, these projects have been cancelled.

See also
 List of airports in South Australia
 Transport in Adelaide
 Transport in Australia

References

External links

 Adelaide Airport Limited
 Adelaide Airport webcam, updated every 60 seconds. The camera is looking northeast from Gate 26
 Video of Qantas A380's first visit to Adelaide Airport

1955 establishments in Australia
Airports established in 1955
Airports in South Australia
Buildings and structures in Adelaide
Transport in Adelaide
International airports in Australia